Horizon Science Academy High School (HSA HS) is a grades 9–12 public charter school managed by Concept Schools. It is located in Columbus, Ohio, United States.

Awards 
Horizon Science Academy Columbus High School received National Blue Ribbon Awards from the U.S. Department of Education in 2009 and 2012. The robotics program at the school was recognized in 2021 as one of three academic programs in the United States endorsed by the Advanced Robotics for Manufacturing consortium in its inaugural endorsement program launch.

References 

High schools in Columbus, Ohio
Public high schools in Ohio
Charter schools in the United States